The Computing and Communications Museum of Ireland was founded in 2010, and is located at the Insight Centre for Data Analytics at the DERI Building, University of Galway.

The museum curates a collection of historical computing machines and artefacts. It is also involved in education and outreach to encourage young people to consider science and engineering careers.

References

External links
 The Computing and Communications Museum of Ireland website

Buildings and structures of the University of Galway
Museums in Ireland